Brace Yourself is the debut album from Dropping Daylight, released on June 13, 2006 on Octone Records.

Tracks
All tracks are written by Sebastian Davin and Dropping Daylight.
 "Tell Me" (3:22)
 "Brace Yourself" (3:34)
 "Waiting Through The Afternoon" (3:06)
 "Apologies" (3:39)
 "Take A Photograph" (3:20)
 "Lucy" (3:00)
 "Soliloquy" (3:00)
 "War Song" (3:14)
 "Blame Me" (2:21)
 "Answering Our Prayers" (3:39)
 "Till You Feel Something" (3:11)

Personnel

Dropping Daylight
 Sebastian Davin – vocals, piano, keyboards
 Seth Davin – guitars, backing vocals
 Rob Burke – bass
 Allen Maier – drums 

Additional personnel
 David Bendeth – producer and mixing , arrangements 
 Dropping Daylight – engineering and arrangements 
 Jake Englund – drums 
 Leon Zervos – mastering
 John Bender – recording engineer, digital editing
 Wayne Davis – digital editing
 Dan Korneff – digital editing
 Ted Young – digital editing
 Kris Lewis – digital editing
 Isaiah Abolin – digital editing
 Ian Allison – additional loop production
 David Young – additional loop production

Singles
"Tell Me" 30 Hot Mainstream Rock Tracks
"Blame Me"
"Till You Feel Something"
"Apologies"

References

2006 albums
Dropping Daylight albums